Martese Jackson (born May 20, 1992) is a professional gridiron football running back and kick returner for the Edmonton Elks of the Canadian Football League. He played college football at Florida Atlantic University.

College career
After transferring from Fort Scott Community College, Jackson played 3 seasons with the Florida Atlantic Owls football team, where he amassed 240 rushing yards and 1 touchdown, while also 392 yards on 22 carries.

Professional career

Winnipeg Blue Bombers
Jackson signed with the Winnipeg Blue Bombers on February 24, 2015, but was released before training camp on April 13, 2015.

Montreal Alouettes
Jackson then signed with the Montreal Alouettes on June 10, 2015, and spent the season on the practice roster. He again spent the 2016 season on the practice roster before being released before the 2017 season on May 1, 2017.

Toronto Argonauts
On May 2, 2017, Jackson signed with the Toronto Argonauts as a free agent. He made the team out of training camp and played in his first game on June 30, 2017. He was named a CFL Top Performer for Week 4 after gaining 339 total return yards in a single game, the fourth-most in CFL history. Overall, he played in 15 regular season games and both playoff games, including the Argonauts' 105th Grey Cup victory over the Calgary Stampeders. In the 15 games he finished with 2,214 kick return yards, 1,133 yards on 52 kickoff returns, 824 yards and two touchdowns on 70 punt returns and 256 yards and one touchdown on four missed field goals.

Edmonton Eskimos
On September 10, 2018, the Argonauts traded Jackson to the Edmonton Eskimos along with a conditional 2020 sixth round draft pick in exchange for a 2019 third round draft pick. Jackson provided a spark on special teams, while also contributing as a change of pace back in six games with Edmonton; Jackson rushed three times for 25 yards, and his first career rushing touchdown, in addition to catching seven passes for 68 yards. Jackson became a free agent, but signed back with Edmonton on May 20, 2019. Jackson went down with injury after six games played, but put up a combined 46 punt and kick returns for 595 yards, improving on his averages with Edmonton from the previous season.

Montreal Alouettes (II)
On October 25, 2021, it was announced that Jackson had signed with the Montreal Alouettes.

Edmonton Elks
The Elks announced that they had traded for Jackson on January 14, 2022.

References

External links
Montreal Alouettes bio
Florida Atlantic Owls bio

1992 births
Living people
African-American players of Canadian football
American football return specialists
American football running backs
Canadian football return specialists
Canadian football running backs
Montreal Alouettes players
Sportspeople from Asheville, North Carolina
Toronto Argonauts players
Florida Atlantic Owls football players
Players of American football from North Carolina
Fort Scott Greyhounds football players
Edmonton Elks players
21st-century African-American sportspeople